Invermoriston (Inbhir Mhoireastain in Gaelic) is a small village  north of Fort Augustus, Highland, Scotland. The village is on the A82 road, at a junction with the A887.

The village's most visited attraction is the Thomas Telford bridge, built in 1813, which crosses the spectacular River Moriston falls.  This bridge used to form part of the main road between Drumnadrochit and Fort Augustus but was replaced in the 1930s with the new bridge used today. Invermoriston's attractions include a hotel, called Glenmoriston Arms, village shop, clog and craft shop  as well as a coffee shop/restaurant. From the top of the hill above the village, Sròn Na Muic (Scottish Gaelic for "The Nose of the Pig"), one can admire the finest views of the Great Glen.

References

Populated places in Inverness committee area
Loch Ness